Pecan Grove is a census-designated place and master-planned community within the extraterritorial jurisdiction of Richmond in Fort Bend County, Texas, United States. The population was 22,782 at the 2020 census.

Geography

Pecan Grove is located northeast of the center of Fort Bend County at  (29.626060, -95.731591). It is bordered to the southwest by the Brazos River. The city limits of Richmond forms a convoluted pattern in the southern part of the CDP, and the northern part is bordered by an exclave of the city of Houston.

Demographics

As of the 2020 United States census, there were 22,782 people, 6,515 households, and 5,485 families residing in the CDP.

As of the census of 2000, there were 13,551 people, 4,516 households, and 3,847 families residing in the CDP. The population density was 1,552.2 people per square mile (599.3/km2). There were 4,662 housing units at an average density of 534.0/sq mi (206.2/km2). The racial makeup of the CDP was 91.29% White, 3.29% African American, 0.19% Native American, 1.34% Asian, 2.51% from other races, and 1.38% from two or more races. Hispanic or Latino of any race were 9.08% of the population.

There were 4,516 households, out of which 52.5% had children under the age of 18 living with them, 76.3% were married couples living together, 7.0% had a female householder with no husband present, and 14.8% were non-families. 12.8% of all households were made up of individuals, and 2.7% had someone living alone who was 65 years of age or older. The average household size was 3.00 and the average family size was 3.29.

In the CDP, the population was spread out, with 33.4% under the age of 18, 5.3% from 18 to 24, 31.9% from 25 to 44, 24.6% from 45 to 64, and 4.8% who were 65 years of age or older. The median age was 35 years. For every 100 females, there were 98.3 males. For every 100 females age 18 and over, there were 95.8 males.

The median income for a household in the CDP was $83,515, and the median income for a family was $91,059. Males had a median income of $62,213 versus $37,658 for females. The per capita income for the CDP was $33,816. About 0.6% of families and 1.3% of the population were below the poverty line, including 0.5% of those under age 18 and 2.2% of those age 65 or over.

Government and infrastructure
A portion of the Texas Department of Criminal Justice Jester State Prison Farm property is located in Pecan Grove.

Fort Bend County does not have a hospital district. OakBend Medical Center serves as the county's charity hospital which the county contracts with.

Education

Fort Bend Independent School District

Most of the students who live in Pecan Grove are zoned to Fort Bend Independent School District (FBISD) schools. The Fort Bend ISD attendance zones for Pecan Grove are:
 Pecan Grove Elementary (Grades PK-5), located in Pecan Grove
 Oakland Elementary School (Grades PK-5) - It was scheduled to open in 2006–2007, and it took territory previously assigned to Pecan Grove Elementary.
 Neil Elementary (Grades PK-5), located adjacent to Travis in Pecan Grove

Secondary schools:
 James Bowie Middle School (Grades 6–8),  located in Pecan Grove
 Travis High School (Grades 9–12), located in Pecan Grove

Previously students were divided between Garcia and Hodges Bend middle schools. Bowie Middle School opened in 2007.

Prior to fall 2006 students were divided between Austin High School and George Bush High School. At the time of the rezoning, the present 11th and 12th graders remained at Austin and Bush, while 9th and 10th graders were immediately rezoned; the Travis zoning was phased in each year.

Lamar Consolidated Independent School District

Other students who live in Pecan Grove area are zoned to Lamar Consolidated Independent School District (LCISD) Schools.

Students zoned to Austin Elementary use the following feeder pattern:
 Austin Elementary (Grades PK-5) - In the CDP
 Wessendorff Middle School(Grade 6)
 Lamar Junior High (Grades 7–8)
 Lamar Consolidated High School ( Grades 9–12)
Students zoned to Frost Elementary use the following feeder pattern:
 Frost Elementary(Grades PK-5) - In the CDP
 Wertheimer Middle School (Grade 6)
 Briscoe Junior High (Grades 7–8)
 Foster High School ( Grades 9–12)

Foster previously served all of LCISD Pecan Grove.

Community colleges
The designated community college for LCISD is Wharton County Junior College.

Notable people
W. A. Criswell, two-term president of the Southern Baptist Convention
Frank Beard - drummer and songwriter for the renowned rock band ZZ Top

References

External links

 

Census-designated places in Fort Bend County, Texas
Census-designated places in Texas